The U.S. State Department's Office to Monitor and Combat Trafficking in Persons placed Poland in "Tier 1"  in 2017. Below is the full copy of a webpage section relating to Poland in a report published by the Bureau of Public Affairs of the United States Department of State, entitled "Country Narratives: Countries N Through Z: Trafficking in Persons Report 2010", which is in the public domain.

The Government of Poland fully complies with the minimum standards for the elimination of trafficking. The government sustained its law enforcement efforts and undertook important steps to improve victim access to government-funded assistance by establishing the National Intervention Consultation Center in April 2009. The government also made specific efforts to ensure identified male victims of forced labor were provided with shelter and necessary assistance, a notable improvement from the previous reporting period.

Prosecution
The Government of Poland demonstrated progress in its overall anti-human trafficking law enforcement efforts during the reporting period. Poland prohibits all forms of trafficking through Article 253, Article 204 Sections 3 and 4, and Article 203 of the criminal code. Article 253 and organized crime statutes are used to prosecute labor trafficking cases, though there are no provisions that specifically define and address trafficking for forced labor. Penalties prescribed under Article 253 range from three to 15 years’ imprisonment, and Articles 203 and 204 prescribe from one to 10 years’ imprisonment; these punishments are sufficiently stringent and commensurate with those prescribed for other serious crimes, such as rape. Law enforcement officials and NGOs continued to report that the lack of a clear legal definition of trafficking in Poland's criminal code limits effective prosecutions. Prosecutors rely on trafficking definitions in the 2000 UN TIP Protocol when pursuing prosecutions against traffickers. Police investigated 105 alleged trafficking offenses in 2009 under Articles 253, 203, and 204 (Sections 3 and 4), compared with 119 alleged trafficking violations in 2008. Polish authorities prosecuted 79 individuals in 2009 under Articles 253, 203, and 204 (Sections 3 and 4), compared with 78 prosecutions in 2008. In 2009, 52 trafficking offenders were convicted in Courts of First Instance under Articles 253 and 203, compared with 46 convictions in 2008. Post-appeal sentences, which are considered final, are collected for Articles 253, 203, and 204 (Sections 3 and 4). In 2008, the most recent year for post-appeal sentencing data, 30 out of 57 convicted traffickers – or 53 percent – received suspended sentences. The remaining 27 convicted traffickers were issued sentences ranging from one to five years’ imprisonment. In 2007, 24 out of 42 – or 57 percent – of convicted traffickers had their sentences suspended.

The government provided training on trafficking awareness and victim identification to officers in the national police, Border Guard, and the Internal Security Agency. In March 2009, the National School for Judges and Prosecutors provided trafficking-specific training for 60 prosecutors. Additional anti-trafficking training and victim identification and treatment training was provided to at least 614 police officers, border guard officials, and social workers. In partnership with a local NGO, the Ministry of Labor and Social Policy focused significant training for law enforcement and social workers on child trafficking issues, including identification and the special needs of children exploited in the sex trade.

Protection
The government continued to improve efforts to assist trafficking victims during the reporting period. During the reporting period, the government identified at least 206 victims of trafficking – including 123 children in prostitution – compared with 315 victims identified by NGOs and government authorities in 2008. In total, 193 victims received some government-funded assistance. The government referred 22 victims for assistance in 2009. In April 2009, the government established the National Intervention Consultation Center, which expanded the ability of authorities to assist victims. The NGO-operated center established a 24-hour hotline, provided direct assistance to victims of trafficking, and served as a consultation point for law enforcement working with victims of trafficking. The national center enhanced victim protection available to foreign victims of trafficking. Previously, only foreign victims who agreed to cooperate with law enforcement were eligible for government-funded emergency assistance. With the establishment of the national center, both Polish and foreign victims were no longer required to be identified by or cooperate with local law enforcement in order to receive government-funded emergency assistance through Poland's victim assistance program.

In 2009, the government allocated approximately $298,000 for victim assistance, including $59,000 for a shelter for use by adult female victims of trafficking. In response to criticism that there were no shelters dedicated to assisting male victims of trafficking, the government housed seven male trafficking victims in a government-run crisis center in January 2010 and enrolled them in the Victim/Witness Protection Program, ensuring they had access to necessary care. Under Polish law, all foreign victims are permitted to stay in Poland during a three-month reflection period, during which time they are eligible to access victim services while they decide whether or not to cooperate with law enforcement. In 2009, no victims took advantage of the 90-day reflection period. Those foreign victims who choose to cooperate are permitted to stay in Poland during the investigation and prosecution process. In 2009, two foreign victims were granted temporary residency permits to remain in Poland pending completion of the prosecution process. However, some trafficking experts expressed concern that some victims who chose not to cooperate with law enforcement may not have been given victim status and therefore may not have received emergency victim assistance. Police encouraged victims to cooperate with law enforcement. In 2009, 22 victims assisted law enforcement, compared with 21 victims in 2008. There were no reports that identified victims were penalized for unlawful acts committed as a direct result of being trafficked.

Prevention
The government demonstrated adequate efforts to prevent trafficking through awareness-raising activities during the reporting period. The Ministry of the Interior forged partnerships with IOM and MTV Polska to develop and air televised public service announcements entitled “Trafficking is a Fact” from October through November 2009. The government funded NGOs to conduct training for school teachers to discuss the basics of human trafficking with students. The government also published and distributed 100,000 copies of a leaflet titled “You are Not For Sale,” targeted at high school and vocational students, educating them about their rights. The Ministry of Labor conducted an information campaign for Polish citizens looking to work abroad, including interactive question and answer sessions on its website that provided information about legal assistance and advice on how to determine the legitimacy of job offers abroad. The government did not conduct a specific campaign to reduce the demand for commercial sex acts targeted at potential clients of prostitution.

See also
Human rights in Poland
Human trafficking in Europe
Slavery in Poland

References

Poland
Poland
Human rights abuses in Poland
Crime in Poland by type